Paul Murry (November 25, 1911 – August 4, 1989) was an American cartoonist and comics artist. He is best known for his Disney comics, which appeared in Dell Comics and Gold Key Comics from 1946 to 1984, particularly the Mickey Mouse and Goofy three-part adventure stories in Walt Disney's Comics and Stories.

Biography
Like many Disney comic book artists, Murry started his career working at the Walt Disney Studios. During his time there he was an assistant to legendary animator Fred Moore.

Starting in 1943, Murry worked on Disney newspaper strips, beginning with several installments of the Sunday-only José Carioca strip. This was followed by a number of episodes in the 1944-1945 Panchito strip, which replaced José Carioca's, as well as some Mickey Mouse strips in 1945. Murry then provided pencil art for the Uncle Remus and His Tales of Br'er Rabbit strip from the first installment on October 14, 1945 through July 14, 1946.

After leaving the studio in 1946, he began to work for Western Publishing doing stories featuring the Disney characters. Dell Four Color No. 129 (1946) featuring three Uncle Remus stories penciled by Murry was the first comic book containing his artwork.

Murry drew many Disney characters, including Donald Duck, Uncle Scrooge, Brer Rabbit, The Sleuth, and others. The Phantom Blot and Super Goof comic books contained many Murry stories. Besides Disney, Murry also drew Woody Woodpecker comics, the 1951–53 Buck O'Rue comic strip (written by Dick Huemer), and gag cartoons.

He is best known for his rendition of Mickey Mouse, especially the Mickey/Goofy adventure stories, mostly in Mickey Mouse, and three-part serials in Walt Disney's Comics and Stories. Murry's first published Mickey Mouse story was "Mickey Mouse and the Monster Whale,"  in Vacation Parade #1 (July 1950). Murry next wrote a couple of Mickey Mouse stories for Dell's One-Shots: "The Mystery of the Double-Cross Ranch" in issue #313 (February 1951) and "The Ruby Eye of Homar-Guy-Am" in #343 (August 1951).

Murry and writer Carl Fallberg began their run of Mickey Mouse and Goofy serials in Walt Disney's Comics and Stories with "The Last Resort", in issues #152–154 (May–July 1953). Murry and Fallberg continued to produce 3-part Mickey/Goofy adventures consistently from 1953 to 1962, and then occasionally from 1963 to 1972. When Fallberg moved on, Murry continued to draw single-part Mickey/Goofy adventures for Walt Disney's Comics and Stories and Mickey Mouse until 1984, retiring after more than 30 years of producing these stories. Murry died five years later, in 1989.

Reprints
In 2018 Fantagraphics Books began publishing a hardcover series titled Disney Masters, in which Paul Murry has some of his Disney work (mainly on Mickey Mouse) reprinted.
 Mickey Mouse: The Case of the Vanishing Bandit (2018) ISBN 
 Mickey Mouse: The Pirates of Tabasco Bay (2019) ISBN 
 Mickey Mouse: The Sunken City (2020) ISBN 
 Mickey Mouse: New Adventures of the Phantom Blot (2021) ISBN 

In 2019 The Library of American Comics released the fourth volume of Silly Symphonies: The Complete Disney Classics, ISBN , in which the complete Silly Symphony comic strips José Carioca and Panchito, both pencilled by Murry, were included.

Bibliography
The following table is a list of Murry's Mickey/Goofy adventure stories, from Walt Disney's Comics and Stories, Mickey Mouse and various specials:

References

Further reading 
 Profili Album Paul Murry: Mice, Ducks and Cheesecake (Glamour International, 2002). Includes a generous selection of Murry's girlie cartoons done in the 1950s along with a sequence from the Buck O'Rue western comic strip Murry did with writer Dick Huemer from 1951–53. The book has text in Italian and English.

External links

Paul Murry at the Lambiek Comiclopedia

More information on Paul Murry
Buck O'Rue page on Huemer family website
1951 publicity article on Buck O'Rue
The Topsy-Turvy Moons of Paul Murry
Disney's B'rer Rabbit Hops Into the Funny Pages
Paul Murry: The Wayne DeWald Letter

American comic strip cartoonists
Disney comics artists
1989 deaths
1911 births